George Sietsema (April 1, 1918March 6, 1991) was a Michigan politician.

Early life and education
George Sietsema was born on April 1, 1918, in Grundy Center, Iowa, to parents Jerry and Gertrude Sietsema. George went through three years of high school before enlisting in the army.

Military career
In 1941, Sietsema enlisted in the United States Army in Kalamazoo, Michigan.

Career
Sietsema was the owner of the Michigan Private Investigation Bureau. Sietsema served as township supervisor, treasurer, and municipal judge in Wyoming Township. He also served on the Kent County Board of Supervisors. In 1956, Sietsema unsuccessfully ran for the Michigan House of Representatives seat representing the Kenty County 2nd district. On November 4, 1964, Sietsema was elected to the Michigan House of Representatives, where he represented the 94th district from January 13, 1965, to December 31, 1966. In 1966, Sietsema unsuccessfully sought re-election to this position. Sietsema served as mayor of Wyoming, Michigan, from 1985 to 1987.

Personal life
In 1940, George Sietsema married Angela Wietsma. Together, they had three children. George was the brother of fellow state representative Jelt Sietsema.

Death
Sietsema died on March 6, 1991.

References

1918 births
1991 deaths
American treasurers
Burials in Michigan
County officials in Michigan
Mayors of places in Michigan
Democratic Party members of the Michigan House of Representatives
People from Grundy Center, Iowa
People from Wyoming, Michigan
Politicians from Grand Rapids, Michigan
United States Army personnel of World War II
20th-century American judges
20th-century American politicians